Böde is a village in Zala County, in Hungary. In its vicinity can be found the church of Böde-Zalaszentmihályfa from the Árpád dynasty age.

Settings
The village can be found south of Zalaegerszeg, the center of Zala County-.

Sightseeings
Before reaching the village, on the right side of the road we catch the beautiful church on the top of a nearby hill standing at the side of the forest. The western doorway is adorned with rich stone carving. The edge of the tympanon arc is adorned with an ornament well known from the Conquest age belt buckles. The lamb holding the cross is regularly exhibited in the medieval romanesque church doorways.

Gallery

References 

Bérczi Szaniszló, Bérczi Zsófia, Bérczi Katalin: Románkori templomkapuk: régi és új műveltség egymásrarétegződése a románkori templomok épületszobrászatában, kapukon és oszlopokon, TKTE, Piremon, 1997.

External links 

 Böde in the Vendégváró homepage
 Aerial images about Bödel

Populated places in Zala County
Romanesque architecture in Hungary